Joseph William Payne (born 2 April 1999) is an English footballer who plays for Enfield Town.

Career
Payne joined Barnet in 2010 from Wormley Rovers as an under-12. He made his debut for the senior team aged 17 when he came on as a substitute for Sam Muggleton in an EFL Trophy game against Peterborough United on 8 November 2016. Later that month, Payne scored from the halfway line in a Middlesex Senior Cup game against Enfield Town. He joined Grays Athletic on loan on 13 January 2017, and went on to make 15 appearances in the Isthmian League Premier Division. The following season, Payne joined Solihull Moors on loan in September. Payne also received man of the match on his debut for the club. He made his full Barnet debut on his 19th birthday away to Stevenage. Payne joined Wealdstone on loan on 2 November 2018. He then joined Enfield Town on loan in March 2019. Payne left the Bees at the end of the 2018–19 season. 

He then re-joined Enfield Town permanently in July 2019. Payne joined Potters Bar Town for the 2020–21 season. 

He signed for Concord Rangers in February 2021, making his debut in the 2020 FA Trophy Final. Payne joined Cheshunt at the start of the 2022-23 season before re-joining Enfield Town.

Career statistics

Honours
Concord Rangers
FA Trophy runner-up: 2019–20

References

External links
 

1999 births
Living people
English footballers
Association football defenders
Barnet F.C. players
Grays Athletic F.C. players
Solihull Moors F.C. players
Wealdstone F.C. players
Enfield Town F.C. players
Potters Bar Town F.C. players
Concord Rangers F.C. players
Cheshunt F.C. players
People from Enfield, London
Footballers from Enfield, London
English Football League players
National League (English football) players
Isthmian League players